The Kuru River, or Chel River is a stream in the South Sudanese states of Western Bahr el Ghazal and Northern Bahr el Ghazal.
It is a headwater of the Lol River.

Course

The Kuru or Chel River forms in the south of Western Bahr el Ghazal on the border with the Central African Republic.
It flows north, passing the road that runs west to Deim Zubeir from Ibra on its east bank, and enters Northern Bahr el Ghazal.

The river continues north to join the Magadhik River between Marial Bai to the west and Nyamlell to the west.
The combined streams form the Loll or Lol River.

Notes

References

Sources

See also
 List of rivers of South Sudan

Rivers of South Sudan
Bahr el Ghazal
Northern Bahr el Ghazal